Days of Waiting (1991) is a documentary short film by Steven Okazaki about Estelle Ishigo, a Caucasian artist who went voluntarily to an internment camp for Japanese Americans during World War II. The film was inspired by Ishigo's book, Lone Heart Mountain, and won an Academy Award for Best Documentary (Short Subject) and a Peabody Award.

Background 
During World War II, when 110,000 Japanese Americans were forcibly relocated from the West Coast to various American concentration camps, Estelle Peck Ishigo refused to be separated from her Nisei (second generation Japanese American) husband. She voluntarily accompanied him to the Heart Mountain War Relocation Center. A painter and illustrator, Ishigo documented her experience through her art. She later published these works and wrote about her experience in her book, Lone Heart Mountain, which along with personal papers, were the basis of the film. She was discovered living in destitution in her senior years, by the filmmakers as they researched her story.

Awards 
 Academy Award for Best Documentary (Short Subject) – 63rd Academy Awards (1991)
 Peabody Award – as presentation in PBS TV series, P.O.V. (1991)
 Gran Prix, Clermont-Ferrand International Short Film Festival (1991)

References

External links
Days of Waiting: The Life & Art of Estelle Ishigo at Farallon Films
 Days of Waiting: The Life & Art of Estelle Ishigo at Center for Asian American Media
 
 Lone Heart Mountain manuscript at UCLA Library's Calisphere

1991 films
Best Documentary Short Subject Academy Award winners
Documentary films about the internment of Japanese Americans
POV (TV series) films
1990s short documentary films
Films directed by Steven Okazaki
American short documentary films
Documentary films about painters
Peabody Award-winning broadcasts
1990 documentary films
1990 films
1990s English-language films
1990s American films